Munteanu is a Romanian language surname. When transliterated from Russian, in may be spelled as Muntyanu. It is commonly found in Romania and Moldova and literally translates as "highlander". Notable people with this surname include:

 Alexandru Munteanu (born 1988), Romanian footballer
 Anastasiya Muntyanu, Canadian gymnast
 Andreea Munteanu (born 1998), Romanian artistic gymnast
 Aura Andreea Munteanu (born 1988), Romanian gymnast
 Cătălin Munteanu (born 1979), Romanian footballer
 Cherasim Munteanu, Romanian sprint canoer
 Cristian Lucian Munteanu (born 1980), Romanian footballer
 Daniel Munteanu (born 1978), Romanian footballer
 Donar Munteanu (1886–?), Romanian poet
 Dorinel Munteanu, (born 1968), retired Romanian footballer and manager
 Eugen Munteanu (born 1953), Romanian linguist
 Florian Munteanu (born 1990), German-Romanian actor
 Gabriel Munteanu, (born 1973), Romanian judoka
 Gavriil Munteanu (1812–1869), Romanian scientist and translator
 Gheorghe Munteanu-Murgoci (1872–1925), Romanian geologist
 Igor Munteanu (born 1965), Moldovan political analyst and journalist
 Ion Munteanu, Moldovan politician
 Ionica Munteanu (born 1979), Romanian female handballer
 Kiara Munteanu (born 1997), Australian female artistic gymnast
 Luminata Munteanu, Romanian sprint canoer
 Marian Munteanu (born 1962), Romanian student leader
 Neculai Munteanu (born 1941), Romanian anti-communist dissident
 Nicodim Munteanu (1864–1948), also known as Patriarch Nicodim, head of the Romanian Orthodox Church 1939–1948
 Nicolae Munteanu (born 1951), Romanian handball player
 Nina Munteanu (born 1954), Canadian ecologist and novelist of science fiction and fantasy
 Olga Munteanu (born 1927), Romanian artistic gymnast
 Petre Munteanu (1916–1988), Romanian operatic tenor 
 Silvia Sorina Munteanu, Romanian opera singer
 Titus Munteanu (1941−2013), Romanian director, filmmaker and producer
 Valeriu Munteanu (disambiguation), multiple people, including:
Valeriu Munteanu (philologist) (1921–1999), Romanian philologist, lexicographer, and translator
Valeriu Munteanu (politician) (born 1980), Moldovan politician
 Virgil Munteanu (born 1988), Romanian Greco-Roman wrestler
 Vlad Munteanu (born 1981), Romanian footballer
 Zamfir Munteanu, Moldovan politician

See also
 20287 Munteanu, an asteroid discovered in March 1998
Muntean

Romanian-language surnames